Maurice "Maurie" Stanley Herring (21 September 1879 – 24 June 1962) was an Australian rules football player at the Melbourne Football Club in the Victorian Football League (VFL). He became one of the club's first premiership players, playing in the 1900 VFL Grand Final, under the captaincy of Dick Wardill. Herring made his debut against  in round 2 of the 1897 VFL season, at the Melbourne Cricket Ground.

In June 1902 he entered Trinity College while undertaking studies at the University of Melbourne.

References

External links

 

1879 births
People educated at Trinity College (University of Melbourne)
People educated at Melbourne Grammar School
Australian rules footballers from Victoria (Australia)
Melbourne Football Club players
1962 deaths
Melbourne Football Club Premiership players
One-time VFL/AFL Premiership players